This is page shows results of Canadian federal elections in the province of Alberta outside the Calgary and Edmonton areas.

Regional profile
Rural Alberta is far and away the most conservative region in Canada.  For most of the last 80 years, the major right-wing party of the day has won all or most of the ridings here, often by astronomical margins.  The Conservative Party of Canada kept this tradition going, often winning every riding in this region by some of the largest margins in the nation, making rural Alberta easily the least competitive region in the country.  This was always the power base for the former Reform and Canadian Alliance parties from 1993 to 2000, and before then the former Progressive Conservative Party swept every riding here from 1972 to 1993.  Social Credit was birthed in rural Alberta, and for many years was either the first or second party in much of the region.  Some ridings in this area were previously friendly to Red Tories, but since the 1990s the entire region has turned in a more fiscal and social conservative direction.  For example, former prime minister Joe Clark represented the riding of Yellowhead and its predecessor, Rocky Mountain, from 1972 to 1993 during his first tenure in parliament, but ran in (and won) the comparatively less conservative seat of Calgary Centre during his comeback to politics in 2000.

Much of this area has not been represented by a centre-left MP in recent memory; for instance, Lethbridge has been represented solely by right-wing MPs since 1930.  The Liberals have been completely shut out in rural Alberta since 1972, and have been barely on the radar screen here for most of the time since then.  As evidence of the antipathy much of the region has for the Liberals, Jack Horner crossed the floor in 1977 to join the Liberals, only to be soundly defeated when he ran for reelection in Crowfoot as a Liberal in 1979, losing almost three-fourths of his vote from 1974.  He was also resoundingly defeated when he tried to regain the riding in 1980. In recent elections the Liberals have drawn their lowest percentage of votes ever; they are usually lucky to draw more than 20 percent of the vote, and in some ridings (Crowfoot and Yellowhead) they have attracted less than three percent.

The New Democratic Party has also had poor results. In fact, the Green Party finished second ahead of the NDP in the Wild Rose riding in 2006. The NDP surged in 2011 across Alberta, including Wilrose. In 2011 the NDP finished second in all of the rural Alberta ridings.

As a measure of how deeply conservative rural Alberta is, the Conservatives held their own in 2015 even as they were heavily defeated nationally. They took every riding with 60 percent or more of the vote, with centre-left parties only managing to crack the 20 percent mark in three ridings. However, support for the Conservatives was not universal; in all but three ridings, the NDP and Liberals together did crack the 20 percent mark, sometimes reaching past 30 percent.

2015 - 42nd General Election

2011 - 41st General Election

2008 - 40th General Election

2006 - 39th General Election

2004 - 38th General Election

Fort McMurray-Athabasca
Crowfoot
Lethbridge
Macleod
Medicine Hat
Peace River
Red Deer
Vegreville-Wainwright
Westlock-St. Paul
Wetaskiwin
Wild Rose
Yellowhead

2000 - 37th General Election

Politics of Alberta
Rural